Lazagurría (Basque Elizagorria) is a village and municipality in the province and autonomous community of Navarre, northern Spain.

References

External links
 
 LAZAGURRIA in the Bernardo Estornés Lasa - Auñamendi Encyclopedia (Euskomedia Fundazioa) 

Municipalities in Navarre